Trevor Robertson (born 20 November 1947) is an Australian cricketer. He played in 32 first-class matches for South Australia between 1977 and 1980.

See also
 List of South Australian representative cricketers

References

External links
 

1947 births
Living people
Australian cricketers
South Australia cricketers
Cricketers from Adelaide